The Cape Santiago Lighthouse ( or  Santiaochiao Lighthouse ) is a lighthouse at Cape Santiago, Gongliao District, New Taipei, Taiwan.

History
The lighthouse was built in 1931 for ship navigation. Since 30 September 2018, the lighthouse has been opened to the public.

Architecture
The lighthouse rises up to 16.5 meters in height. The lighthouse features a gallery on its information and equipment.

Transportation
The lighthouse is accessible by bus from Taipei Main Station or Fulong Station.

See also

 List of tourist attractions in Taiwan
 List of lighthouses in Taiwan

References

External links

 Maritime and Port Bureau MOTC

1931 establishments in Taiwan
Lighthouses completed in 1931
Lighthouses in New Taipei